The 24th Annual Latin Grammy Awards will take place in November 2023 in Seville, Spain. The awards will honor recordings released between June 1, 2022, and May 31, 2023. It will mark the first time that the awards are held outside of the United States.

References

External links
The Latin Recording Academy Official Site

21st century in Seville
21st century in Andalusia
2023 in Spain
Events in Andalusia
Events in Seville
2023 in Spanish music
November 2023 events in Spain
2023 in Latin music
2023 music awards
2023